Scott & Bailey is an ITV crime drama. The series debuted on 29 May 2011, and stars Suranne Jones, Lesley Sharp, Amelia Bullmore, Danny Miller, Nicholas Gleaves, and Pippa Haywood.

Main cast and characters

Overview

Rachel Bailey 

Rachel Bailey (Suranne Jones) is an Acting Detective Inspector (A/DI) and the ranking officer within the Syndicate 9 Major Incident Team. A career woman, Rachel was aged 32 during series two. Since joining the Manchester Metropolitan Police in 2001, Rachel has earned the nickname "Sherlock" for her deductive and investigative skills. It was these skills that led to Rachel joining MIT in 2010, and her subsequent swift promotion from Detective Constable during the show's fourth series. Her personal life, however, is fraught with self-destructive (even childish) behaviour and strained family relationships that tend to adversely affect her work. In Series 3 she marries former flame PC Sean McCartney, but soon realises it was a mistake and has a fling with DC Kevin Lumb, which causes tension with Janet. After a rocky start, she started to take her new role as Sergeant in her stride with Gill telling her she was proud of her. During the fifth series, Rachel will return to Syndicate 9 following a Vice secondment in London. In this capacity, Rachel is promoted to Acting Detective Inspector.

Janet Scott 

Janet Scott (Lesley Sharp) is Rachel Bailey's working partner and close friend. She is a quick-witted, friendly and long-standing member of the team. Janet was 46 at the start of the series and attended Bruche alongside Andy Roper in 1982. She is more logical, and finds satisfaction in her job, and refusing repeated offers for promotion. Lesley Sharp describes her as "a woman who is at the top of her game in a job but who has deliberately chosen to stay in what appears to be one of the lower ranks" instead of progressing to a more senior position. Her marriage to Adrian disintegrates as the series progresses, which leads to an impulsive affair with DS Andy Roper before she breaks it off. She was inspired to join the police after the unsolved murder of her childhood friend Veronica Hastings, which she finally solves near the end of series one. In series three, Janet is promoted to Acting Detective Sergeant. In series four, she is once again given the opportunity for promotion, but declines. Janet joined MIT in 2009, after a career break. Also in series four, Janet begins dating DC Chris Crowley. They separate sometime prior to the start of the fifth series. In series five, Janet's daughter is arrested for possession and distribution of indecent images of children.

Gill Murray 

Gill Murray (Amelia Bullmore) is a Detective Chief Inspector, the head of MIT and a single mother to Sammy. Nicknamed "Godzilla" by Rachel, Gill is authoritarian, abrupt and naturally sardonic, though she occasionally has a nicer side. She has been close friends with Janet for over 20 years, and attended Bruche alongside Dave Murray and Mitch in 1984. In 2008, following her divorce from Dave, Gill is offered the opportunity to head Syndicate 9 MIT, which she runs with ruthless efficiency, pushing hard for results and refusing to accept failure. Her relationship with Rachel is largely work-based and at times strained by Rachel's impulsive, maverick nature. After being taken hostage and nearly killed in the Series 3 finale, as well as coming under pressure to retire, Gill becomes an alcoholic in Series 4, which leads a concerned Janet to report her to Dodson. She later retires with her reputation intact. Gill is responsible for promoting Rachel to Detective Sergeant in series four. Gill is not replaced following her departure, and as such a series of temporary SIO's rotate through Syndicate 9 from other MIT departments. Rachel later takes this position on a semi-permanent basis, a transition she describes as "walking in a dead woman's shoes, while she's still watching".

Andy Roper 

Andy Roper (Nicholas Gleaves) is a Detective Sergeant. He has been desperately in love with Janet since they attended Bruche together in 1982, though their relationship sours when she realises she does not reciprocate his rather intense feelings. After a shouting match in front of the team, Gill forces them into a room alone, where Andy admits that a previous marriage fell apart for similar reasons, causing him to have a nervous breakdown.  Although they appear to resolve things, in the Series 2 finale he gives Janet misinformation that causes Gill to miss an appointment with the coroner, humiliating her.  Since neither admits to causing the confusion, Gill tells the pair to decide which of them will leave the MIT. Later, Gill tells Andy he was overheard misspeaking and, believing he did so on purpose, forces him to transfer out. Andy leaves for Syndicate 6.

Rob Waddington 

Rob Waddington (Danny Miller) is a young, fast-tracked Detective Sergeant who was hired after Janet insisted she didn't want a promotion following Andy's departure. He is shown to be a decent officer, but lacks the confidence and leadership skills of Gill, causing the team to make fun of him at times. He also has a slightly flirtatious relationship with Janet, which Rachel exploits by sending him a sexually-suggestive e-mail using Janet's account; although she intends it as a joke, Rob is embarrassed enough to report it to Gill and Janet is infuriated. As part of his fast-track career progression, Rob leaves the MIT early in Series 4 for a sex crimes unit, leading to Rachel being promoted to DS. In his career, Rob was following in the footsteps of his father, whose competence is called into question when an old case is reopened during Rob's last week with MIT and leads Rob to clash with Rachel during the course of the investigation.

Julie Dodson 

Julie Dodson (Pippa Haywood) is head of Syndicate 3 and close friends with Gill Murray. Kevin used to work for her until he was moved to MIT, and he harbours a deep resentment. Haywood joined the cast in the second series, notably when handling the inquiry into the murder of Nick Savage, and becomes more prominent in the latter half of Series 3 when asked to lead the Helen Bartlett case. Noting the character's close relationship with Gill, Haywood stated, "I like the double act between Julie and Gill Murray. When they are at work they have this reputation that they are fearsome; a force to be reckoned with, but there's also a lot of humour between them". Late in Series 4 Dodson is asked by Janet to investigate allegations that Gill is drunk on the job, putting a deep strain on their friendship when Gill's ability to lead the MIT is called into question. Following Gill's departure, Dodson assigns a series of temporary SIOs to Syndicate 9, staffed exclusively by Constables. She later promotes Rachel into the position of Detective Inspector.

Supporting cast and characters

Overview

Nick Savage 

Nicholas "Nick" Savage (Rupert Graves) was a wealthy barrister and Rachel's ex-lover. After he abruptly breaks up with her in the first episode, she abuses her police resources to track him down, discovering he was in fact married with two sons. He had an apartment in the city centre, which Rachel blackmailed him into letting her move into by threatening to inform his wife Caroline (Louise Delamere) of their affair. Rachel finds out she is pregnant with Nick's baby and plans to have an abortion, though she ultimately decides against it. However, she later miscarries, which Nick takes advantage of to reclaim the apartment after Caroline learns of his infidelity anyway and kicks him out. Rachel soon discovers that Nick had an affair with a female juror whilst defending a client and business associate, which if made public would destroy his career.  When Nick hears of this, he gets back together with Rachel and (at her pressuring) proposes marriage, until Janet convinces Rachel he is only doing so to keep her from turning him in.  In the Series 1 finale Rachel narrowly avoids being killed by a hit-and-run driver; she eventually learns this was done at the behest of Savage, who is arrested and charged with attempted murder.

Savage does not appear in Series 2, but is mentioned throughout. In the third episode Gill discovers that the attempted murder charge has been dropped. He is later released without charge; upon learning of this, Rachel goes on a bender with Janet and lets out months worth of anger and misery over the fact that he essentially got away with ruining her life. In the Series 2 finale Savage is attacked and brutally beaten, later dying in hospital. Dominic, Rachel's brother, is revealed to be the attacker, claiming he was driven to it after hearing his sister's anguish; she chases him down and berates him, but ultimately chooses to let him run. In Series 3 he is caught and sent to prison after an investigation proves that Rachel had nothing to do with the attack.

Kevin Lumb 
Detective Constable Kevin Lumb (Ben Batt) was the joker of the team.  Of the Detective Constables in MIT, he was the most overtly condescending and sexist, and yet he became upset and defensive when mocked for his arrogance and general incompetence. After failing his Sergeant's exam early in Series 3, he was told by Gill that he didn't deserve to be in her unit. Rachel, whose life he once saved whilst arresting a violent suspect, impulsively has sex with him during her marriage to Sean McCartney. At the time Rachel is hiding from Sean at Janet's; she brings Kevin there and they are soon discovered. Janet's outrage and Rachel's unapologetic attitude leads to a short but deep rift in their friendship. Rachel soon admits of the affair to Sean, who corners Kevin - the best man at the wedding - and punches him in the face before the rest of the office, exposing the relationship to all their colleagues. In the same episode, the unit is informed by Gill that Kevin has been fired and arrested for leaking information on a big murder case to the press (though earlier series imply this is not the first time he has done so). Kevin doesn't appear again after this but Gill later mentions in Series 4 that Kevin is serving time in HM Prison Manchester, confirming that Kevin was convicted and jailed for his crimes.

Ian Mitchell 
DC Ian Mitchell (David Prosho), known to his friends as Mitch, is a DC assigned to Syndicate 9. He often serves as support to Scott & Bailey, though on occasion he is called to make arrests. In series five, Ian loses his day-planner and inadvertently leaks information about a murder case to the press, infuriating Rachel, who is acting head of MIT at the time. To "prove [to Rachel that] he wasn't useless," Mitch enters a house on his own to confront an ex-Army officer suffering from PTSD, who stabs him in the throat; Mitch dies soon after.

Pete Readyough 
DC Pete Readyough (Tony Mooney) is a Detective assigned to Syndicate 9.  Pete becomes more prominent during Series 3, as his personal and professional lives suffer after he drunkenly has sex with Rachel's mother at a wedding reception. His wife throws him out of their house and the team, with the exception of Janet, shows little sympathy. In series five, he is unable to accept Rachel as a superior officer and tends to openly challenge her authority.

Lee Broadhurst 
DC Lee Broadhurst (Delroy Brown) is a Detective assigned to Syndicate 9.

Chris Crowley 
DC Chris Crowley (Danny Webb) is assigned to Syndicate 9 in Series 4. He finds himself often partnered with and soon becomes close to Janet. The two engage in a short term relationship, though they later separate because "nice" became "boring". Crowley transferred to a different department shortly thereafter, before the events of Series 5.

Anna Ram 
DC Anna Ram (Jing Lusi) is a Detective assigned to Syndicate 9. She was hired in Rachel's absence, and as such the two share an unspoken hostility during the fifth series. She is seen to be having a committed relationship with a woman, and doesn't drink alcohol.

Sean McCartney 
PC Sean McCartney (Sean Maguire) first appears in Series 2 as an old flame of Rachel's. Over the course of an investigation they reconnect and become an item (to the chagrin of Kevin). Sean is any easygoing guy who never seems to get worked up about anything; though his persistent attempts to woo Rachel irritate her, he is supportive and always there to help when she needs it. Eventually he proposes marriage, going so far as to set a date and make the arrangements without telling her first. A reluctant Rachel agrees to the engagement in the Series 2 finale, after Sean turns up evidence exonerating her in a murder inquiry. Their wedding is shown in flashbacks in the second episode of Series 3. Rachel soon realizes the marriage was a mistake, as she never really wanted it, and after a one-night-stand with a stranger she has sex with Kevin Lumb (their best man). In the penultimate episode of Series 3 Rachel admits the affair to Sean, who attacks Kevin in the middle of the office, humiliating all three of them, before getting a divorce.

Will Pemberton 
DSI Will Pemberton (Steve Toussaint) appears in Series 4 as the head of the Vice team.  He enters into a relationship with Rachel, and secures her a Vice secondment in London. The two later separate.

Recurring cast and characters

Overview

Alison Bailey 
Alison Bailey (Sally Lindsay) is Rachel's older sister and is married with children.  When their mother walked out, Alison essentially became the mother of the Bailey household, which she feels cost her the chance to do something with her life. As a result, she harbours a deep resentment towards their mother. Alison's relationship with Rachel and Dominic is strained at times because of her maternal instincts and occasional self-righteous behaviour but she tries very hard to support them. Sally Lindsay, who alongside Suranne Jones created the original idea for Scott & Bailey, has appeared in every series.

Dave Murray 
DCS (Detective Chief Superintendent) Dave Murray (Vincent Regan), Gill's ex-husband, is well-known for his philandering ways and irresponsible attitude toward his work. He is father of her son, Sammy (Jake Roach) but left Gill when he got a 23-year-old uniform officer pregnant. In the first series Dave is acting Head of the Review Team while the head is away on maternity leave, causing friction between him and Gill.  In Series 1 he appears to be deeply jealous when Gill enters into a new relationship, which manifests itself in petty office sniping. During Series 2, in which his personal life collapses (to the delight of MIT), he barges into Gill's house and launches into a drunken speech that culminates in him tearfully asking her if she still has feelings for him; a visibly upset Gill nevertheless refuses to even consider giving him a second chance.

Mary Jackson 
Mary Jackson (Julia Deakin in Series 2 and Judy Holt thereafter), or "Scary Mary" as she is nicknamed by the department, is one of the pathologists who carries out post-mortem examinations in the mortuary. Her morbid sense of humour plays well off Gill Murray's more blunt attitude, especially since Gill has a habit of personally attending crime scenes and port mortems.

Dominic Bailey 
Dominic Bailey (Liam Boyle), Rachel's younger brother, is introduced in Series 2. He had previously served a prison sentence for armed robbery. With nowhere to go after Alison throws him out, he ends up living with Rachel, who encourages him to look for work.  At one point she walks in on him selling sex to a man in her home; outraged, she tells him to get tested for HIV, which comes back negative.  Dominic's stay with Rachel is marked by his irresponsibility and tendency to get in trouble; he nearly destroys her kitchen attempting to cook her a meal and crashes her car during a joyride, which forces her to miss her sergeant's exam. It is also suggested a few times that he had a drinking problem, and later on Alison and Rachel discuss the possibility that he is mentally slow. Despite her exasperation, Rachel continues to stand by him.

In series 3 he is charged with murder and goes back to prison, though not before he alleges that Rachel provoked him to commit the crime, which leads to her brief (re)arrest.

Sharon Bailey 
Sharon Bailey (Tracie Bennett), Rachel's mother, appears in the third series after being mentioned several times in Series 1 and 2. She is a boisterous, impulsive alcoholic who abandoned her children and is loathed by Alison, though Rachel tries to forgive her. Sean McCartney discovers that she was the one who sent bouquets of flowers to Rachel throughout the first two series. She drunkenly has sex with DC Pete Readyough in a car park at Rachel and Sean's wedding reception, but they are caught by Gill. Sharon uses this to extort money from Pete until he decides to admit it to his wife. His professional reputation is tarnished (along with a brief decline in his competency), and his marriage collapses. In Series 4 Sharon appeals to Rachel for help when her latest boyfriend becomes violent with her.

Adrian Scott 
Adrian "Ade" Scott (Tony Pitts), a geography teacher, was Janet's husband for twenty-five years. The pair have two teenage daughters, Taisie and Elise (Sharon Flynn in Series 1 and Olivia Rose Smith from Series 2 onward). Early in Series two Ade walks out to live with his elderly father following various petty arguments with Janet's mother. Janet, at first appealing to him to stay, loses her temper and says she is fed up with his lazy, self-entitled behavior. Nevertheless, she continues to rely on him to help with their daughters and realizes just how much of their life he was responsible for maintaining. In the Series 2 finale Janet attempts a reconciliation, but this is ruined when Andy Roper spitefully reveals that his affair with Janet began long before their separation. Early in Series three, Ade admits he is seeing someone and tells Janet he wants a divorce.

Taisie Scott 
Taisie Scott (Harriet Waters) is Janet's younger daughter. In series five she is arrested for possession and distribution of child pornography after taking photographs of her boyfriend's penis. In order to clear her daughter's name, Janet solicits further images on her behalf. It is implied that the case is subsequently dropped.

Dorothy Parsons 
Dorothy Parsons (Judith Barker) is Janet's mother. Dorothy moves in with the family for three months while recuperating from a big operation, and later buys Ade's share of the house at Janet's suggestion. She is shown to be incredibly fond of Gill, though she dislikes Rachel.

Geoff Hastings 
Geoff Hastings (Kevin Doyle) is the brother of Janet's murdered childhood friend Veronica. He persuades Janet to review the cold case, which a retired detective has connected to the unsolved murders of four other women over the years. Janet's friendship with Geoff causes tension with Andy Roper, who sees a romantic rival and behaves coldly toward him. When MIT investigates a new murder with the same MO, Rachel and Janet come to realize that Geoff is a serial killer, and Veronica was his first, albeit unintended, victim. He stabs and nearly kills Janet while fleeing her home but is later arrested. He pleads guilty to the murders and is sentenced to prison. In the fifth episode of Series 2 Geoff claims to have information regarding fifteen other murders he allegedly committed, but will only talk to Janet. Instead he plays mind games with her, in the process revealing her affair with Andy to Gill.  He also states that he made detailed diaries regarding the murders, but refuses to reveal where they are. Rachel, while on a bender, inadvertently guesses that the journals are buried with Geoff's mother, whom he loathed (and is implied to be the motivation for his killing spree). When asked about this Geoff becomes furious, validating Rachel's theory.

Helen Bartlett 
Helen Bartlett (Nicola Walker) appears throughout Series 3 as the daughter of Joe and Eunice Bevan, who molested and murdered young boys for years, burying the bodies in their cellar. In the season premiere Helen becomes a suspect in Eunice's brutal murder, before Joe is found to be the killer. Helen later admits that Joe also killed her brother and forced her to bury the body, but this only results in Helen's arrest for denying lawful burial. Further investigation unearths the bodies of one of Helen's sisters under the floorboards of her parents' bedroom. A statement from the only surviving victim alleges that Helen was a willing participant in the rape, torture, and murder of the boys in the cellar; though this is proven to be untrue, it leads to a harassment campaign against Helen and her partner Louise by both public and press. In the series finale, a drunk and angry Helen takes Gill hostage, but ends up slitting her own wrists and bleeding to death. In Walker's first appearance, in episode one of the third series she looked "immaculate" working on a make-up counter in a department store, however, the veneer fades as her childhood trauma becomes apparent.

Neil Simpson 
Neil Simpson (Gregg Chillin) is a SCAS Detective who appears in the fifth series. He is instrumental in the closing of Rachel's first case as a DI, and the two appear to be friends.

References 

Scott and Bailey